The Pentax K100D and similar Pentax K110D are 6-megapixel digital single-lens reflex cameras, launched in the U.S. on May 22, 2006. The K100D has a maximum resolution of 3008 x 2008, and can also down-sample to 2400 x 1600 and 1536 x 1024. The slowest metered shutter speed is 30 seconds and the fastest shutter is 1/4000 seconds.

The K100D features a 6-megapixel CCD sensor, coupled with an analog-to-digital converter (ADC) and a sensor-based shake reduction system within the camera body.  The K110D has exactly the same features as the K100D, except it lacks built-in shake reduction.

The K100D is sometimes confused with the similarly named, but more advanced, Pentax K10D.  The Pentax K200D, successor to the K100D and K100D Super, was officially announced on January 23, 2008.

K100D Super 

On June 27, 2007, Pentax announced the K100D Super. It retains the features and the 6.1-megapixel image sensor of the K100D, while adding support for Supersonic Drive Motor(SDM) lenses and dust-reduction technology. Although K100D Super was announced in June, it seems that camera was in production since January 2007 (manufacture date found in Exif data of shots).

The K100D, K100D Super and K110D were discontinued in favor of the K200D and K-m.

References

External links
 Express review of the K100D at Neocamera
 Pentax K100D review Phonerev.com
 K100D review by DPreview.com
 K100D review by DCresource.com
 K100D review by imaging-resource.com
 K100D Super review from DigitalCameraReview.com

K100D
Cameras introduced in 2006
Pentax K-mount cameras